Orbitestelloidea are a superfamily of minute sea snails, marine gastropod molluscs or micromolluscs in the infraclass Lower Heterobranchia.

Families
 Orbitestellidae Iredale, 1917
 Xylodisculidae Warén, 1992
Synonyms
 Microdisculidae Iredale & McMichael, 1962: synonym of Orbitestellidae Iredale, 1917 (unavailable name: no diagnosis)

References

 Bouchet P., Rocroi J.P., Hausdorf B., Kaim A., Kano Y., Nützel A., Parkhaev P., Schrödl M. & Strong E.E. (2017). Revised classification, nomenclator and typification of gastropod and monoplacophoran families. Malacologia. 61(1-2): 1-526

Lower Heterobranchia
Gastropod superfamilies